is a Japanese politician of the Liberal Democratic Party, a member of the House of Representatives in the Diet (national legislature). A native of Tokyo and a high school graduate, he was elected for the first time in 2005 after working at a manufacturer of soft drinks.

See also 
Koizumi Children

References 
 

Members of the House of Representatives (Japan)
Koizumi Children
People from Tokyo
1949 births
Living people
Liberal Democratic Party (Japan) politicians